The Pacific ocean perch (Sebastes alutus), also known as the Pacific rockfish, Rose fish, Red bream or Red perch, is a fish whose range spans across the North Pacific : from southern California around the Pacific rim to northern Honshū, Japan, including the Bering Sea. The species appears to be most abundant in northern British Columbia, the Gulf of Alaska, and the Aleutian Islands .

Taxonomy
The Pacific ocean perch was first formally described as Sebastichthys alutus in 1890 by the American ichthyologist Charles Henry Gilbert with the type locality given as the Santa Barbara Islands off California. Some authorities place this species in the subgenus Acutomentum. The specific name alutus means "unwashed" thought to be an allusion to the dusky color with dark blotches along the back.

Distribution, habitat and migration
The Pacific ocean perch is found in the North Pacific Ocean where its range extends from Honshu in Japan to Cape Navarin in the Bering Sea, although they are absent from the Sea of Okhotsk, through the Aleutian Islands from Stalemate Bank to Bowers Bank and south along the west coast of North America as far as La Jolla in California.

Adults are found primarily offshore on the outer continental shelf and the upper continental slope in depths 150–420 m. Seasonal differences in depth distribution have been noted by many investigators. In the summer, adults inhabit shallower depths, especially those between 150 and 300 m. In the fall, the fish apparently migrate farther offshore to depths of ~300–420 m. They reside in these deeper depths until about May, when they return to their shallower summer distribution.

This seasonal pattern is probably related to summer feeding and winter spawning. Although small numbers of Pacific ocean perch are dispersed throughout their preferred depth range on the continental shelf and slope, most of the population occurs in patchy, localized aggregations. Pacific ocean perch are generally considered to be semi-demersal but there can at times be a significant pelagic component to their distribution. Pacific ocean perch often move off-bottom at night to feed, apparently following diel euphausiid migrations. Commercial fishing data in the Gulf of Alaska since 1995 show that pelagic trawls fished off-bottom have accounted for as much as 20% of the annual harvest of this species.

Life history
There is much uncertainty about the life history of Pacific ocean perch, although generally more is known than for other rockfish species. The species appears to be viviparous (the eggs develop internally and receive at least some nourishment from the mother), with internal fertilization and the release of live young. Insemination occurs in the fall, and sperm are retained within the female until fertilization takes place ~2 months later. The eggs hatch internally, and parturition (release of larvae) occurs in April–May.

Information on early life history is very sparse, especially for the first year of life. Pacific ocean perch larvae are thought to be pelagic and drift with the current, and oceanic conditions may sometimes cause advection to suboptimal areas resulting in high recruitment variability. However, larval studies of rockfish have been hindered by difficulties in species identification since many larval rockfish species share the same morphological characteristics. Genetic techniques using allozymes  and mitochondrial DNA are capable of identifying larvae and juveniles to species, but are expensive and time-consuming.

Post-larval and early young-of-the-year Pacific ocean perch have been positively identified in offshore, surface waters of the GOA, which suggests this may be the preferred habitat of this life stage. Transformation to a demersal existence may take place within the first year. Small juveniles probably reside inshore in very rocky, high relief areas, and by age 3 begin to migrate to deeper offshore waters of the continental shelf . As they grow, they continue to migrate deeper, eventually reaching the continental slope, where they attain adulthood.

Ecology
Pacific ocean perch are mostly planktivorous,. In a sample of 600 juvenile perch stomachs, found that juveniles fed on an equal mix of calanoid, copepods and krill. Larger juveniles and adults fed primarily on euphausiids, and to a lesser degree, copepods, amphipods and mysids. In the Aleutian Islands, myctophids have increasingly comprised a substantial portion of the Pacific ocean perch diet, which also compete for euphausiid prey. It has been suggested that Pacific ocean perch and walleye pollock compete for the same euphausiid prey. Consequently, the large removals of Pacific ocean perch by foreign fishermen in the Gulf of Alaska in the 1960s may have allowed walleye pollock stocks to greatly expand in abundance.

Predators of adult Pacific ocean perch are likely sablefish, Pacific halibut, and sperm whales. Juveniles are consumed by seabirds, other rockfish, salmon, lingcod, and other large demersal fish.

Population
Pacific ocean perch is a very slow growing species, with a low rate of natural mortality (estimated at 0.06), a relatively old age at 50% maturity (10.5 years for females in the Gulf of Alaska), and a very old maximum age of 98 years in Alaska (84 years maximum age in the Gulf of Alaska). Age at 50% recruitment to the commercial fishery has been estimated to be between 7 and 8 years in the Gulf of Alaska. Despite their viviparous nature, the fish is relatively fecund with number of eggs/female in Alaska ranging from 10,000 to 300,000, depending upon size of the fish.

The evolutionary strategy of spreading reproductive output over many years is a way of ensuring some reproductive success through long periods of poor larval survival. Fishing generally selectively removes the older and faster-growing portion of the population. If there is a distinct evolutionary advantage of retaining the oldest fish in the population, either because of higher fecundity or because of different spawning times, age-truncation could be ruinous to a population with highly episodic recruitment like rockfish. Recent work on black rockfish (Sebastes melanops) has shown that larval survival may be dramatically higher from older female spawners  The black rockfish population has shown a distinct downward trend in age-structure in recent fishery samples off the West Coast of North America, raising concerns about whether these are general results for most rockfish. Studies of this species and the rougheye rockfish (S. aleutianus) for senescence in reproductive activity of older fish and found that oogenesis continues at advanced ages. It has been shown that older individuals have slightly higher egg dry weight than their middle-aged counterparts. Such relationships have not yet been determined to exist for Pacific ocean perch or other rockfish in Alaska.

Few studies have been conducted on the stock structure of Pacific ocean perch. Based on allozyme variation, and Pacific ocean perch are genetically quite similar throughout their range, and genetic exchange may be the result of dispersion at early life stages. In contrast, preliminary analysis using mitochondrial DNA techniques suggest that genetically distinct populations of Pacific ocean perch exist (A. J. Gharrett pers. commun., University of Alaska Fairbanks, October 2000). It has been found that there are distinct genetic populations on a small scale in British Columbia.  Currently, genetic studies are underway that should clarify the genetic stock structure of Pacific ocean perch.

Commercial fishing

The fishery for Pacific ocean perch developed nearly synchronously from the U.S. West Coast to the Bering Sea. The Gulf of Alaska fishing history captures a typical catch history: A Pacific ocean perch trawl fishery by the U.S.S.R. and Japan began in the Gulf of Alaska in the early 1960s. This fishery developed rapidly, with massive efforts by the Soviet and Japanese fleets.  Catches peaked in 1965, when a total of nearly 350,000 metric tons (t) was caught.  This apparent overfishing resulted in a precipitous decline in catches in the late 1960s.  Catches continued to decline in the 1970s, and by 1978 catches were only 8,000 t.  Foreign fishing dominated the fishery from 1977 to 1984, and catches generally declined during this period.  Most of the catch was taken by Japan.  Catches reached a minimum in 1985, after foreign trawling in the Gulf of Alaska was prohibited.

Conservative management measures, an excellent observer program, and perhaps higher productivity in Alaska have allowed the stock to recover to a level to allow about 26,000 tons per annum.  The U.S. West Coast stock was declared rebuilt in 2017 after 17 years in a rebuilding plan.

References

Other references

Gulf of Alaska Pacific ocean perch stock assessment (2009)
Bering Sea and Aleutian Islands Pacific ocean perch stock assessment (2008)
 Pacific ocean perch NOAA FishWatch. Retrieved 5 November 2012.
Canadian Pacific ocean perch stock assessment (2001)
U.S. West Coast Pacific ocean perch stock assessment (2009)
NOAA's Alaska Fisheries Science Center

Pacific ocean perch
Fish of the North Pacific
Commercial fish
Pacific ocean perch
Taxa named by Charles Henry Gilbert